María Eugenia Rodríguez Ruiz (born 26 November 1994) is a Venezuelan footballer who plays as a defender for Famalicão and the Venezuela women's national team.

Club career
Rodríguez played the 2018 Copa Libertadores Femenina for Bolivian side Deportivo ITA.

She joined her first European club in July 2021, signing for Famalicão of the Portuguese Campeonato Nacional Feminino.

International career
Rodríguez represented Venezuela at the 2010 FIFA U-17 Women's World Cup and the 2014 South American U-20 Women's Championship. At senior level, she played the 2010 South American Women's Football Championship and the 2018 Central American and Caribbean Games.

References

External links

1994 births
Living people
Women's association football central defenders
Women's association football midfielders
Venezuelan women's footballers
Footballers from Caracas
Venezuela women's international footballers
Caracas F.C. (women) players
Atlético Bucaramanga footballers
Santiago Morning footballers
Venezuelan expatriate women's footballers
Venezuelan expatriate sportspeople in Colombia
Expatriate women's footballers in Colombia
Venezuelan expatriate sportspeople in Bolivia
Expatriate women's footballers in Bolivia
Venezuelan expatriate sportspeople in Chile
Expatriate women's footballers in Chile
F.C. Famalicão (women) players
Campeonato Nacional de Futebol Feminino players
Venezuelan expatriate sportspeople in Portugal
Expatriate women's footballers in Portugal